Manuera Benjamin Rīwai Couch  (27 June 1925 – 3 June 1996) was a New Zealand politician and rugby union player. He was a team-member of the All Blacks and the New Zealand Māori rugby union team in the 1940s.

Early life
Couch was born in 1925 in Lyttelton. He was raised by his maternal grandmother in Christchurch until the age of eight, when he was sent to live with his maternal uncle near Pirinoa in rural Wairarapa. He was educated at Ōtaki Māori College, and then, from 1940 to 1942, Christchurch Technical College. After a carpentry apprenticeship in Christchurch, Couch joined the Royal New Zealand Air Force in August 1943, and later transferred to the army.

In 1945, Couch returned to Pirinoa to work as a builder, and in 1947 he married Bessie Carter, his childhood sweetheart. Carter was a member of the Church of Jesus Christ of Latter-day Saints, and Couch converted to that faith in 1949.

Rugby union
A first five-eighth, Couch represented Wairarapa at a provincial level, and was a member of the New Zealand national side, the All Blacks, from 1947 to 1949. He played seven matches for the All Blacks including three internationals. Of Ngāi Tahu and Ngāti Mutunga descent, he also played 20 matches for New Zealand Māori between 1948 and 1950.

Political career

In the 1975 general election, he was elected to Parliament as the National Party member of parliament for the Wairarapa electorate, thus becoming (with Rex Austin) only the second and third Māori (after Sir James Carroll) to win a general electorate (as opposed to a Māori electorate).

He served as Minister of Māori Affairs and Minister of Police in the third National Government, but lost his seat in 1984 to Labour's Reg Boorman. While Minister of Police, he called for the birch to be introduced for violent offenders and allowed the police to use longer batons. 

He created some controversy by wearing a Springbok rugby team blazer at the time of their 1981 tour of New Zealand as well as attending a public meeting organised by the League of Rights. This was despite his having been denied entry to South Africa as part of the All Blacks rugby team in the 1940s because of his race.

In June 1981, he was asked "So you support apartheid in South Africa?" to which he responded "Yes. Over there I've got to".

In 1977, Couch was awarded the Queen Elizabeth II Silver Jubilee Medal, and in 1990 he received the New Zealand 1990 Commemoration Medal. In the 1991 Queen's Birthday Honours, Couch was appointed a Companion of the Queen's Service Order for public services.

Later life and death
In the 1990s, Couch was involved in various Māori organisations. He died in 1996 in Masterton.

References

|-

1925 births
1996 deaths
New Zealand National Party MPs
Members of the New Zealand House of Representatives
New Zealand MPs for North Island electorates
Members of the Cabinet of New Zealand
New Zealand sportsperson-politicians
New Zealand Latter Day Saints
Converts to Mormonism from Methodism
New Zealand international rugby union players
Māori All Blacks players
Rugby union fly-halves
Māori MPs
Ngāi Tahu people
Ngāti Mutunga people
Companions of the Queen's Service Order
New Zealand military personnel of World War II
Unsuccessful candidates in the 1987 New Zealand general election
Unsuccessful candidates in the 1984 New Zealand general election
Unsuccessful candidates in the 1972 New Zealand general election
Unsuccessful candidates in the 1963 New Zealand general election
Rugby union players from Canterbury, New Zealand
People from Lyttelton, New Zealand